Eucalyptus ultima is a species of mallee that is endemic to a small area in the Gascoyne region of Western Australia. It has smooth bark, linear to narrow lance-shaped leaves, flower buds in groups of nine to fifteen, white flowers and spherical to cup-shaped fruit.

Description
It has smooth grey to pinkish bark, sometimes with rough, fibrous bark near the base. Flowering occurs from April to August and the flowers are white.

Taxonomy and naming
Eucalyptus ultima was first formally described in 1999 by Lawrie Johnson and Ken Hill in the journal Telopea from specimens collected by Ian Brooker in the Shothole Canyon in the Cape Range National Park in 1977. The specific epithet (ultima) is from the Latin ultimus meaning "farthest" or "most distant", referring to its occurrence compared to related eucalypts.

Distribution and habitat
This mallee is only known from rocky rises in the Cape Range National Park, where it grows in skeletal soils over limestone.

Conservation status
This eucalypt is classified as "not threatened" by the Western Australian Government Department of Parks and Wildlife.

See also
List of Eucalyptus species

References

Eucalypts of Western Australia
ultima
Myrtales of Australia
Plants described in 1999
Mallees (habit)
Taxa named by Lawrence Alexander Sidney Johnson
Taxa named by Ken Hill (botanist)